In physics and mathematics, time domain electromagnetics refers to one of two general groups of techniques (in mathematics, often called ansätze) that describe electromagnetic wave motion. In contrast with frequency domain electromagnetics, which are based on the Fourier or Laplace transform, time domain keeps time as an explicit independent variable in descriptive equations or wave motion.

References

 S. M. Rao, E. K. Miller, Time Domain Electromagnetics, Academic Press: San Diego etc., 1999.

External links 
 The Virtual Institute for Nonlinear Optics (VINO), a research collaboration devoted to the investigation of X-waves and conical waves in general
 Nolinear X-waves  page at the nlo.phys.uniroma1.it  website.

Wave mechanics